Borgo Santa Maria is a small town located 10 km west of Latina, in Lazio, Italy. Its population amounted to 640 in 2011 (Istat census).

References

Cities and towns in Lazio
Frazioni of the Province of Latina